The 1981 Tournament Players Championship was a golf tournament in Florida on the PGA Tour, held March 19–23 at Sawgrass Country Club in Ponte Vedra Beach, southeast of Jacksonville. The eighth Tournament Players Championship, it was the fifth consecutive at Sawgrass and the champion was Raymond Floyd.

The final round on Sunday was washed-out by thunderstorms and played on Monday. 
After 72 holes, three players were tied at 285 (−3): Floyd, Barry Jaeckel, and Curtis Strange. The playoff began at the par-3 15th hole, where Floyd made par and the other two had bogeys. 

In addition to the winner's share of $72,000, Floyd won a $250,000 bonus for consecutive victories during the tour's Florida swing; he won at Doral near Miami the previous week.

Defending champion Lee Trevino finished four strokes back, in a tie for twelfth place.

Venue

This was the fifth and last Tournament Players Championship held at Sawgrass Country Club; it moved to the nearby TPC at Sawgrass Stadium Course in 1982. The new course was scheduled to make its debut in 1981,  but heavy rains during construction pushed it back a year.

Eligibility requirements 
1. All designated players

2. Winners of major PGA Tour co-sponsored or approved events beginning with the 1980 Tournament Players Championship and concluding with the tournament immediately preceding the 1981 TPC

Lee Trevino, Doug Tewell, Craig Stadler, Seve Ballesteros, Roger Maltbie, Tom Watson (3), Mark Pfeil, Curtis Strange, Bruce Lietzke, David Graham, John Mahaffey, Larry Nelson, Jack Nicklaus, Bob Gilder, Scott Simpson, Billy Kratzert, Scott Hoch, Howard Twitty, Peter Jacobsen, Don Pooley, Wayne Levi, Phil Hancock, Ben Crenshaw, Mike Sullivan, Dan Halldorson, Danny Edwards, David Edwards, Johnny Miller, John Cook, Hale Irwin, Andy Bean, Tom Kite, Raymond Floyd

3. The current British Open champion

4. Leaders in the PGA Tour Official Standings as necessary to complete the field, beginning with the 1980 TPC and concluding with the Jackie Gleason-Inverrary Classic, which concludes March 8, 1981

Source:

Field
John Adams, Buddy Allin, Wally Armstrong, Butch Baird, Seve Ballesteros, Miller Barber, Andy Bean, Chip Beck, Mike Brannan, Brad Bryant, George Burns, George Cadle, Rex Caldwell, Bill Calfee, Roger Calvin, Antonio Cerda Jr., Jon Chaffee, Bobby Clampett, Jim Colbert, Bobby Cole, Frank Conner, Charles Coody, John Cook, Ben Crenshaw, Rod Curl, Jim Dent, Bruce Devlin, Terry Diehl, Mike Donald, Bruce Douglass, Skip Dunaway, Bob Eastwood, Danny Edwards, David Edwards, Dave Eichelberger, Lee Elder, Keith Fergus, Ed Fiori, Raymond Floyd, John Fought, Buddy Gardner, Gibby Gilbert, Bob Gilder, Jaime Gonzalez, Mike Gove, David Graham, Lou Graham, Hubert Green, Jay Haas, Joe Hager, Gary Hallberg, Dan Halldorson, Phil Hancock, Morris Hatalsky, Mark Hayes, Vance Heafner, Dave Hill, Lon Hinkle, Scott Hoch, Joe Inman, Hale Irwin, Peter Jacobsen, Barry Jaeckel, Tom Jenkins, Grier Jones, Gary Koch, Billy Kratzert, Wayne Levi, Bruce Lietzke, Gene Littler, Lyn Lott, Mark Lye, John Mahaffey, Roger Maltbie, Rik Massengale, Terry Mauney, Mike McCullough, Mark McCumber, Jerry McGee, Pat McGowan, Artie McNickle, Steve Melnyk, Johnny Miller, Jeff Mitchell, Gil Morgan, Mike Morley, Bob Murphy, Jim Nelford, Larry Nelson, Jack Newton, Bobby Nichols, Jack Nicklaus, Mike Nicolette, Lonnie Nielsen, Andy North, Mark O'Meara, Peter Oosterhuis, Arnold Palmer, Jerry Pate, Calvin Peete, Mark Pfeil, Gary Player, Dan Pohl, Don Pooley, Greg Powers, Tom Purtzer, Dana Quigley, Sammy Rachels, Victor Regalado, Mike Reid, Jack Renner, Chi-Chi Rodríguez, Bill Rogers, Mark Rohde, John Schroeder, Bob Shearer, Jim Simons, Scott Simpson, Tim Simpson, J. C. Snead, Ed Sneed, Mick Soli, Craig Stadler, Dave Stockton, Curtis Strange, Ron Streck, Mike Sullivan, Alan Tapie, Doug Tewell, Barney Thompson, Leonard Thompson, Jim Thorpe, Lee Trevino, Howard Twitty, Tommy Valentine, Bobby Wadkins, Lanny Wadkins, Bobby Walzel, Tom Watson, D. A. Weibring, Tom Weiskopf, Larry Ziegler, Fuzzy Zoeller

Round summaries

First round
Thursday, March 20, 1981

Source:

Second round
Friday, March 20, 1981

Source:

Third round
Saturday, March 21, 1981

Source:

Final round
Monday, March 23, 1981

Playoff
The sudden-death playoff began and ended at the par-3 15th hole.

References

External links
The Players Championship website

1981
1981 in golf
1981 in American sports
1981 in sports in Florida
March 1981 sports events in the United States